Union County Public Schools is a school district serving Union County, Kentucky. Communities served by the school district include Morganfield, Sturgis, Sullivan, Uniontown, Waverly and surrounding areas.

Schools

Elementary schools
 Morganfield Elementary School
 Sturgis Elementary School
 Uniontown Elementary School

Middle schools
 Union County Middle School

High schools
 Union County High School

Additional programs
 Union County Learning Academy
 Victory School

References

Not to be confused with Union County Public Schools, North Carolina

External links
 Union County Schools

Education in Union County, Kentucky
School districts in Kentucky